Thomas or Tom Martin may refer to:

Born 16th century 
Thomas Martin (politician, died 1583) (1530–1583), MP for Dorchester
Thomas Martin (lawyer) (1521–1593), MP for Ludgershall, Saltash and Hindon

Born 17th century 
Thomas Martin of Palgrave (1697–1771), British antiquary and book collector
Thomas Martin (banker) (c. 1679–1765), British banker and Whig politician

Born 18th century 
Thomas Bryan Martin (1731–1798), early American jurist, legislator, and prominent landowner
Thomas Byam Martin (1773–1854), British Admiral and Member of Parliament for Plymouth
Thomas Barnwall Martin (1784–1847), Irish landowner and Member of the British Parliament for County Galway

Born 19th century 
Thomas Mower Martin (1838–1934), English-born Canadian landscape painter
Thomas S. Martin (1847–1919), United States Representative and Senator from Virginia
Thomas Martin (Canadian politician) (1850–1907), Canadian Member of Parliament
Thomas Acquin Martin (1850–1906), English industrialist in India
Thomas Commerford Martin (1856–1924), American electrical engineer and editor
Thomas "Doc" Martin (1864–1935), American physician in Taos County, New Mexico
Thomas Reed Martin (1866–1949), Florida architect
Thomas L. Martin (1885–1958), soil agronomist
Tom Martin (Australian footballer) (1888–1949), Australian rules footballer
Thomas E. Martin (1893–1971), United States Representative and Senator from Iowa
Sir Thomas Carlaw Martin (1850–1920), newspaper editor and Director of the Royal Scottish Museum
Thomas Martin (moderator) (1856–1942), Scottish minister, Moderator of the General Assembly of the Church of Scotland
Thomas Martin (footballer), English footballer for Bradford City

Born 20th century 
Thomas Lyle Martin Jr. (1921–2009), president of the Illinois Institute of Technology
Thomas Martin (Conservative politician) (1901–1995), British Member of Parliament for Blaydon
Thomas Martin (cricketer) (1911–1937), Irish cricketer
Thomas K. Martin (born 1960), American fantasy author
Tom Martin (writer) (born 1964), American television writer
Tom Martin (ice hockey, born 1947), Canadian hockey player for the Maple Leafs
Thomas Martin (musician) (born 1940), American-born double bass player and luthier
Tom Martin (Texas politician) (1948–2018), mayor of Lubbock, Texas
Thomas R. Martin (born 1947), American historian at the College of the Holy Cross
Thomas Martin (Maine politician), American politician and businessperson
Thomas Martin (judoka) (born 1956), American judoka
Tom Martin (ice hockey, born 1964), Canadian hockey player for the Jets, Whalers and North Stars
Tom Martin (baseball) (born 1970), American pitcher
One of twins James and Tom Martin (born 1977), British musicians
Thomas Martin (racing driver) (born 1978), American racecar driver
Tommy Martin (boxer) (born 1994), British boxer

See also
Martin Thomas (disambiguation)
Thomas Martyn (disambiguation)
Thomas Marten (disambiguation)